The 2011–12 Canadian network television schedule indicates the fall prime time schedules for Canada's major English and French broadcast networks. For schedule changes after the fall launch, please consult each network's individual article.

2011 official fall schedule

Sunday

Monday

Tuesday

Wednesday

Thursday

Friday

Saturday

Top weekly ratings 
 Note: English Canadian television only by viewers age 2 and up
 Data sources: BBM Canada official website

References

External links
BBM Canada Top Weekly Television Ratings 

2011 in Canadian television
2012 in Canadian television
Canadian television schedules